For Colored Girls is a 2010 American drama film adapted from Ntozake Shange's 1975 original choreopoem for colored girls who have considered suicide / when the rainbow is enuf. Written, directed and produced by Tyler Perry, the film features an ensemble cast which includes Janet Jackson, Whoopi Goldberg, Phylicia Rashad, Thandiwe Newton, Loretta Devine, Anika Noni Rose, Tessa Thompson, Kimberly Elise, Kerry Washington, and Macy Gray.

The film depicts the interconnected lives of ten black women, exploring their lives and struggles as women of color. It is the first film to be produced by 34th Street Films, an imprint of Tyler Perry Studios, and distributed by Lionsgate Films. It is also the first R-rated film directed by Perry. With a budget of $21 million, For Colored Girls was released on November 5, 2010, grossing $20.1 million in its opening weekend.

The film's lead cast consists of ten women of color, seven of whom are based on the play's seven characters, only known by colour (e.g. "lady in red", "lady in brown", and "lady in yellow"). Like its source material, each character deals with a different personal conflict, such as love, abandonment, rape, infidelity, and abortion.

Plot

Each woman is represented by a color: Jo Bradmore represents red, Tangie Adrose represents orange, Yasmine represents yellow, Juanita Sims represents green, Kelly Watkins represents blue, Nyla Adrose represents purple, and Crystal Wallace represents brown. Additionally, the characters of Alice Adrose, who represents white, and Gilda, who represents black, were made specifically for the film.

The film opens with the nine main characters reciting a poem of their inner thoughts ("Dark Phrases"). Kelly arrives at Tangie's brownstone to see Crystal about the safety of her children. At that time, Juanita arrives to leave her lover, Frank, a potted plant and telling him that she is breaking off their affair ("No Assistance"). Kelly attempts to speak with Crystal's children about how they ended up in the hospital but is unsuccessful when Crystal's alcoholic boyfriend, Beau Willie, kicks her out. Crystal's nosy neighbor and apartment manager, Gilda, informs Kelly of Crystal's situation ("A Night with Beau Willie Brown") and reveals she was the one who called her. Meanwhile, Alice, Tangie's mother, shows up to beseech Tangie for money but gets rebuffed instead.

Alice goes out to raise money and encounters Yasmine, who gives her some. Yasmine is boasting to the girls in her dance class about Bill, a man she met. One of Yasmine's dance students, Nyla, is talking with the girls about her graduation night and losing her virginity ("Graduation Nite"), and later begins to vomit.

Juanita is waiting in Jo's office at a magazine company. Crystal shows up for work, having been running late, and informs Jo that her 9 o'clock appointment has arrived, despite it already being 10 o'clock. Juanita is then allowed in to attempt to interest Jo in giving some money to a non-profit organization that specializes in women's health care but is rudely rebuffed.

Kelly is with Donald, her partner, at the gynecologist, who informs Kelly that she cannot have children due to scarring in her fallopian tubes caused by an untreated STD. Juanita is at the hospital giving advice on safer sex to women when Frank comes along to ask for forgiveness, but Juanita refuses to give in to his advances. Crystal implores Beau Willie to stop drinking, while he only cares about marrying her to increase his welfare benefits. At a restaurant, Jo leaves a voice message on her husband's, Carl, phone, imploring him to call her.

At that same restaurant, Yasmine and Bill have a date night together, recalling a story about her love for Latin dances ("Now I Love Somebody More Than"). Alice comes home to her apartment and it is revealed that Nyla is Alice's daughter and Tangie's sister. Alice gives Nyla the feeble amount of money she made, under the belief that it is for Nyla's college application fees. Meanwhile, Yasmine is walking home from her date with Bill, explaining that she loved dance more than anything until she met Bill ("Now I Love Somebody More Than" cont.).

Nyla shows up at Tangie’s apartment to ask for money, explaining that she needs it for college, but Tangie is not fooled. She then deduces that Nyla is pregnant, but Nyla denies this. Tangie relishes the fact that Nyla is not so perfect after all and that Alice will hate her the way she hates Tangie. She then tells her about the time she got pregnant and reveals where to find a back-alley abortionist.

Jo waits impatiently for Carl to return home and it is then revealed that Carl was the man Donald had arrested earlier. The couple then gets into an argument about Carl investing in a failed company with Jo's money, which Carl did because he felt emasculated as a man, who is not providing and forfeiting his right to do anything in favor of submitting to Jo's will. Donald returns to his and Kelly's apartment where Kelly then reveals how she got her STD. She explains that before she was married, she and two of her friends had been seeing the same man and all contracted a disease from him ("Pyramid").

The next day, Carl reveals that he got tickets to the opera, which he hates, as an apology for last night's argument with Jo. During this conversation, he is clearly looking at other men desirously. Tangie goes to pay the three hundred dollars for Nyla's college fees but Yasmine reveals that the dance class is free.

Tangie realizes that Nyla went to see the abortionist, Rose (Macy Gray), who is terrifying, and probably drunk. Nyla loses consciousness during the abortion as Rose tells her a story about her life in Harlem ("I Used to Live in the World"). Yasmine excitedly invites Bill into her home for dinner where he savagely rapes her. Jo and her husband are at the opera, watching a performance of La Donna in Viola (an Italian, operatic version of "Pyramid"). During the performance, Jo watches as her husband cruises another man.

The next day, Crystal left papers for Jo’s meeting at home. Crystal offers to take the train home, but Jo tells her that'll waste time and offers to drive her there. Seeing the male driver in the car, Beau Willie believes Crystal is having an affair and the abuse begins. Their children overhear Beau Willie beating Crystal and Gilda tries to calm their fears by telling them a story about how she met her first husband ("Toussaint").

Beau Willie asks Crystal to marry him once again. After she refuses, Beau Willie becomes violent and dangles the children over the fifth-story window, giving Crystal an ultimatum. Gilda runs out into the street and screams for help as Jo, Juanita and several on-lookers witness Beau Willie drop the children to their deaths ("A Night with Beau Willie Brown" cont.).

Donald interrogates Yasmine at the hospital about her rape, where he informs her that it'll be difficult to press charges as she tells him that women can be raped anywhere by anyone ("Latent Rapists"). At the same hospital, Alice comes in search of Nyla, who is being interrogated by Renee and Kelly, and gives them and Alice a vivid detail of her abortion ("Abortion Cycle #1"). After being informed of the situation and recognizing Crystal, Kelly becomes visibly upset.

Alice confronts Tangie in her apartment and after a physical altercation, they reveal to each other that Tangie was raped by her grandfather, Alice's father, causing Alice to take her to the abortionist where Alice supervised her, whereas Nyla was unsupervised. Alice reveals that her father took her virginity and was given to a white man at fifteen to have children. All these events explained why Tangie is the way she is ("One" cont.). After kicking Alice out of her apartment, Gilda comes into her house to put ice on the bruise on Tangie's face. She explains that Tangie and her mother make a lot of sense before telling her a detailed account of Tangie's exploits ("One" cont.). Tangie believes that Gilda has been snooping again through the wall, but Gilda reveals that she was once like Tangie.

Carl comes home to find Jo distraught and reveals what happened with Crystal, stating that she never once knew she was abused and wondering what kind of person she was. Jo and Carl embrace as she sobs into his shoulder. Alice and Nyla return to their apartment where Alice tells her to pray for forgiveness. As Nyla prays, Alice attempts to exorcise her with ashes and hot oil, hurting Nyla. Nyla runs away to Yasmine's apartment, hoping to find some comfort. However, Yasmine is too traumatized from her rape to answer the door.

Kelly is waiting outside the brownstone as Crystal comes out with a pail and a brush to wash away the blood of her children. Crystal comments that she does not feel awake and thinks that this is what death must feel like. Nyla passes by and Kelly takes her into Crystal's apartment to wash her up. Hearing Tangie bring in yet another suitor to her apartment, Nyla confronts her. Tangie kicks her suitor out after he asks her to invite Nyla for a threesome. Tangie and Nyla hash out their problems before Tangie reveals that her life is complicated and she is still learning from her mistakes ("No More Love Poems #4").

Yasmine is practicing an interpretive dance ("Sechita") as Kelly discovers that Crystal has swallowed an entire bottle of pills. Crystal is taken to the hospital as Yasmine is visited by Donald, who has informed her that Bill has been murdered after attempting to rape another woman. She goes into the morgue to look at his body one last time, before slapping him and then leaving.

That night, Kelly is unable to sleep, feeling guilty for not taking Crystal's children away sooner. Juanita comes home with a birthday cake for Frank, only to find that he is not home and his clothes are gone. Juanita vents her frustration to her women's health class ("Somebody Almost Walked Off Wid Alla My Stuff") as Crystal is released from the hospital and goes into therapy. Jo gives Juanita a check for her non-profit organization, Beau Willie is sent to jail, and Nyla returns to dance class with Yasmine.

Tangie invites Crystal to Nyla’s going away party. Crystal initially declines. Tangie begrudgingly invites Gilda, both finally having an unspoken, mutual respect for each other. Juanita breaks things off with Frank for good ("No More Love Poems #1"). Crystal is still wondering how Beau Willie could do such a thing, but Gilda tells her that she also needs to take responsibility for not leaving Beau Willie sooner.

Jo confronts Carl on his homosexuality, which he angrily denies at first but Jo tells him that she was not oblivious to the way Carl looks at other men. After venting his frustrations over Jo's controlling nature, he then admits that he has been sleeping with other men and tells her that he is sorry. Jo, however, tells him that she is not accepting his apology, having heard him apologize many times before ("Sorry"). Jo then reveals that she is HIV-positive from Carl's exploits and tells Carl to leave when she gets back home.

At Nyla's going away party, all the women gather to celebrate. Jo and Juanita have a conversation on the rooftop about HIV, while the other women come out to join them, including Crystal, as the women talk about the value of their love ("My Love Is Too") and share their experiences with men's apologies ("Sorry" cont.).

Crystal tells everyone that she was missing something in her life and the women reveal the hurt and pain they've gone through in their lives, before coming together to embrace Crystal and each other ("A Laying on of Hands") and move forward with their lives.

Cast
 Janet Jackson as Joanna "Jo" Bradmore ("Lady in Red")
 Thandiwe Newton as Tangie Adrose ("Lady in Orange") (as Thandie Newton)
 Anika Noni Rose as Yasmine ("Lady in Yellow")
 Loretta Devine as Juanita Sims ("Lady in Green")
 Kerry Washington as Kelly Watkins ("Lady in Blue")
 Tessa Thompson as Nyla Adrose ("Lady in Purple")
 Kimberly Elise as Crystal Wallace ("Lady in Brown")
 Whoopi Goldberg as Alice Adrose ("Lady in White")
 Phylicia Rashad as Gilda ("Lady in Black")
 Macy Gray as Rose ("Lady in Pink")
 Michael Ealy as Beau Willie Brown
 Omari Hardwick as Carl Bradmore
 Hill Harper as Donald Watkins
 Khalil Kain as Bill
 Richard Lawson as Frank

Production
On September 3, 2009, Lionsgate announced it had acquired the distribution rights to Tyler Perry's 34th Street Films adaptation of the play, with principal photography originally scheduled to take place in Atlanta, Georgia in November and December 2009, with a planned 2010 release. The film was written, directed, and produced by Perry. The cast includes Loretta Devine, Kimberly Elise, Whoopi Goldberg, Janet Jackson, Phylicia Rashad, Anika Noni Rose, Kerry Washington, Thandiwe Newton, and Tessa Thompson. Mariah Carey had also been cast, but pulled out in May 2010, citing medical reasons (later revealed to be her pregnancy); Thandiwe Newton was cast to replace her. Macy Gray was also cast.

Originally using the play's full title, the film's title was shortened to For Colored Girls in September 2010. In an October 2010 press conference with the cast, Perry credited his full body of work for being able to make the film, stating, "It took everything—Madea, House of Payne and all of that—for me to be able to do For Colored Girls. Had none of that happened I wouldn't have been able to say, 'Listen, this is what I want to do next,' so I’m very proud of it all."

When asked if she held reservations about Perry's adaptation of her work, Shange responded: "I had a lot of qualms. I worried about his characterizations of women as plastic." In reference to the film post-production, she stated, "I think he did a very fine job, although I'm not sure I would call it a finished film."

Soundtrack

For Colored Girls: Music From and Inspired by the Original Motion Picture Soundtrack was released on November 2, 2010. It features music from the cast, as well as Leona Lewis, and Nina Simone.

Release
The film was originally planned for a 2010 release, but was later delayed until January 14, 2011. However, the studio chose to move the release date forward to November 5, 2010; Tyler Perry commented it was "a serious film that really lends itself to the Fall period." Grossing $20.1 million in its opening weekend, For Colored Girls debuted at the box office at #3, behind Megamind ($47.7 million) and Due Date ($33.5 million).

Critical reception
On Metacritic the film received a weighted average score of 50 out of 100, based on 33 reviews, which indicates "mixed or average reviews". On Rotten Tomatoes 32% of 109 critics gave the film a positive review, with an average rating of 5.20/10. The site's consensus is that "Tyler Perry has assembled a fine cast for this adaptation of the 1975 play, and his heart is obviously in the right place, but his fondness for melodrama cheapens a meaningful story". Audiences polled by CinemaScore gave it a grade "A" on a scale from A+ to F.

Early reviews from a private screening by Variety and The Hollywood Reporter were negative. Peter DeBruge of Variety stated that "[i]n adapting Ntozake Shange's Tony-nominated play—a cycle of poetic monologues about abuse, abortion and other issues facing modern black women, rather than a traditional narrative—the do-it-all auteur demonstrates an ambition beyond any of his previous work. And yet the result falls squarely in familiar territory, better acted and better lit, perhaps, but more inauthentically melodramatic than ever." Despite an overall negative view of the film's plot and direction, DeBruge gives praise to the acting of its principal cast.

Kirk Honeycutt of The Hollywood Reporter highlighted the difficulty in translating Shange's poetic play to film. He commented: "No, it never was going to be easy, but someone needed to put creative sweat into this one, to reach for cinematic solutions to the theatrical challenge. All Perry does is force conventional plots and characters—utter cliches without lives or souls—into the fabric of Shange's literary work. The hackneyed melodramas get him from one poem to the next but run roughshod over the collective sense of who these women are." Honeycutt acknowledged the talents of the film's actresses, highlighting performances by Phylicia Rashad, Anika Noni Rose, and Kimberly Elise.

Critic Marshall Fine gave a negative review in The Huffington Post. He asserts Perry's screenplay is inadequate for its source material, stating that each character "gets the opportunity to suddenly burst into Shange's poetic arias. But the connective tissue that links the various stories ... amounts to a college course in black social pathology—or perhaps just human pathology." Acknowledging the acting talent of the ensemble cast, he states: "Don't get me wrong. The women of this film all shine, hitting strong emotional notes that ring true even when Perry's adaptation feels false ... So let's just say that For Colored Girls is a barely competent film (which is a big step up for Perry), illuminated by luminous performances."

Lisa Schwarzbaum of Entertainment Weekly comments: "The female cast is great, with especially fierce performances from Loretta Devine, Kimberly Elise, Phylicia Rashad, and Anika Noni Rose. But stuck in a flailing production that might just as well invite Perry's signature drag creation Madea to the block party, the actors' earnest work isn't enuf."

Claudia Puig of USA Today called the film a "strained soap opera" which "has wrung the beauty and truth out of the original in almost every way possible." Mary Pols of Time magazine states that despite the caliber of the cast, "Elise's performance is the only restrained one in the film and her Crystal is For Colored Girls' most compelling character." She concludes that "For Colored Girls feels like the cinematic equivalent to putting a garish reproduction of the Sistine Chapel on the ceiling of your McMansion and calling it art."

In contrast, a review by Shadow and Act was favorable, calling For Colored Girls "the best thing Perry has done to date." Perry is complimented on his cinematography, and use of "subtlety and nuance", although his screenwriting is still considered to be the weakest aspect of the film. Like previous reviews, praise is given to the acting quality of the cast, especially regarding performances given by Thandiwe Newton, Janet Jackson, and Kimberly Elise. The Huffington Post journalist Jenee Darden gave a mixed review. She comments that Perry's modern plot conflicts with the narrative of Shange's poetry which was written during the 1970s, explaining: "The film is set in the present and black people don't use the word 'colored' anymore. Watching a character type on a laptop then hearing someone describe themselves as 'colored' a few scenes later doesn't feel realistic."

She commends the acting of the cast, stating "Kimberly Elise stirs you as always. Loretta Devine is funny and vivid. Thandie Newton delivers as a troubled, selfish sex addict. She and Whoopi were matched perfectly as a mother and daughter with serious tensions. Singer Macy Gray's eerie portrayal of a back-alley abortionist will make you rethink ever having unsafe sex." Roger Ebert comments that "Shange's award-winning play is justly respected, but I'm not sure it’s filmmable, and I’m pretty sure it wasn't a wise choice for Perry ... That’s not to say 'For Colored Girls' doesn't have its virtues. Seeing these actresses together is a poignant reminder of their gifts, and of the absence of interesting roles for actresses in general and African-American ones in particular."

Betsy Sharkey of the Los Angeles Times gave a positive review, stating that "[w]ith a surgical precision, the writer-director cut [Shange's poetry] apart and reassembled it, using various pieces to create characters and storylines, keeping much of the poetry, writing the connective tissue himself so that it finds a new life, a somewhat different life on screen," and said it is his most "mature" film to-date. Commenting on the acting of the ensemble cast, she states: "Newton's Tangie swings too wildly; Goldberg's Alice, clad in white and rage, never finds traction; and Rashad, as the apartment manager Gilda, the central link between many of the characters, never quite connects, so it often feels as if she's walked onto the wrong stage" but adds that "[w]hatever stumbles there may be, they are offset by moments when 'For Colored Girls' soars," ultimately describing the film as "unforgettable."

Mick LaSalle of the San Francisco Chronicle called For Colored Girls "a serious achievement." He compliments Perry's work, stating "this new film shows a mastery of tone, a capacity to elicit strong performances and also to bring out different colors within those performances so that, when it all comes together, it's not the same note sounding over and over. This is smart, lovely work." Manohla Dargis of The New York Times called the film "a thunderous storm of a movie." Dargis states that "working with fine performers like Ms. Elise, Anika Noni Rose, Phylicia Rashad and Kerry Washington, he sings the song the way he likes it—with force, feeling and tremendous sincerity."

Matt Zoller Seitz of Salon.com calls For Colored Girls Perry's "most problematic work. It's also his most ambitious." He adds that "Perry never solves the stage-to-screen translation problem. But the path he has chosen is as intriguing as it is irksome, and it works better than you might expect." In terms of acting, he praises Jackson's performance, stating: "[s]he outdoes herself here ... It's not just Jackson's short haircut and traumatized eyes that might remind viewers of Jane Wyman or Joan Crawford; Perry gets at the mix of masculine hyper-competitiveness and feminine vulnerability that has always defined Jackson, and links it to the wily, lonely coldness often captured in Wyman and Crawford performances, a directorial gambit of tremendous perceptiveness." In addition, he says Perry "is just as sharp directing Jackson's costars—especially Elise, Rashad and Devine."

Accolades
For Colored Girls has received accolades primarily from African American film and critic associations, in multiple categories including acting, writing, directing and overall production. Kimberly Elise has received the most acting nomination among the cast, followed by Anika Noni Rose and Phylicia Rashad.

See also
 List of black films of the 2010s

References

External links
 
 
 
 

2010 films
2010 romantic drama films
American romantic drama films
Films directed by Tyler Perry
Films scored by Aaron Zigman
Films with screenplays by Tyler Perry
African-American films
African-American gender relations in popular culture
African-American LGBT-related films
American LGBT-related films
American films based on plays
Films shot in Atlanta
Films shot in New York City
Films set in Atlanta
Films about rape
Films about abortion
Films about dysfunctional families
2010s feminist films
2010 LGBT-related films
American feminist films
2010s English-language films
2010s American films